Ainojie "Alex" Irune  is a Nigerian business executive and strategist. He is the Chief Operating Officer of Oando Energy Resources, an Exploration and Production company in the Nigerian energy sector (an upstream subsidiary of Oando) and an executive director of Oando Plc.

Irune oversees Oando Energy Resources' operational oversight of its 16 onshore and offshore assets across Nigeria and São Tomé and Príncipe.

Early life and education 
Irune studied Computer Science at the University of Nottingham graduating in 2002. He also obtained a PhD in Computer Science from the same university in 2009.

Career
Irune started his career as a researcher and In-Vehicle Systems Designer working with car manufacturers (Honda, Nissan and Jaguar Land Rover) and the University of Nottingham in the United Kingdom.

In 2011, he joined Oando, working in cross-functional roles including serving as the Head of Corporate Communications between 2013 and 2016. In this role, he oversaw all internal and external brand-building efforts across the company's business entities including the communications strategy following Oando's $1.5bn acquisition of ConocoPhillips Nigeria's upstream assets.

Irune joined the Oando Energy Resources (OER's) management in 2018 following his previous role as the Group Chief Strategy & Corporate Services Officer at Oando PLC between 2016 and 2018.

References

21st-century Nigerian businesspeople
Nigerian chief executives
Nigerian business executives
Businesspeople from Lagos
Alumni of the University of Nottingham
Living people
Residents of Lagos
Nigerian corporate directors
Year of birth missing (living people)